Burwood Girls' High School is a public, comprehensive, secondary school for girls, located in Croydon, an inner western suburb of Sydney, New South Wales, Australia.

Established in 1929, the school enrolled approximately 1,150 students in 2018, from Year 7 to Year 12, of whom one percent identified as Indigenous Australians and 69 percent were from a language background other than English. The school is operated by the NSW Department of Education in accordance with a curriculum developed by the New South Wales Education Standards Authority; the principal is Mia Kumar.

Overview 
The school's catchment area includes the suburbs of Croydon, Burwood, Croydon Park, Ashfield, Summer Hill, Haberfield, and Five Dock. The school community is diverse in terms of ethnicity, culture and socio-economic mix.

In the 2006 Higher School Certificate, the National Education Directory of Australia named Burwood Girls High School the sixth best performing school, and the best non-selective public school in Sydney's Inner-West.

Curriculum 
Burwood Girls High School is registered and accredited with the New South Wales Board of Studies, and therefore follows the mandated curriculum for all years. Students may also choose from a select number of Vocational Education and Training (VET) subjects through TAFE NSW and additional languages through The Open High School.

In the 2006 HSC, the National Education Directory of Australia named Burwood Girls the sixth best performing school, and the best non-selective public school in Sydney's Inner-West.

Notable alumni
 Lorraine Bayly actress; founding member of the Ensemble Theatre Company; named as one of 100 Variety Entertainers of the Century, recipient of 3 Logie Awards
 Lee Da-haeSouth Korean actress
 Jennie George former member of the Australian House of Representatives, representing the Division of Throsby
 Gracie Ottoactress, film producer, writer and film director
 Dale Spender feminist; researcher and writer
 Nicola Carey- cricketer

See also 

 List of government schools in New South Wales
 List of girls' schools in New South Wales
 Education in Australia

References

External links
 

Public high schools in Sydney
Educational institutions established in 1929
Girls' schools in New South Wales
Croydon, New South Wales
1929 establishments in Australia